The Bel-Air Country Club is a social club located in Bel Air, Los Angeles, California. The property includes an 18-hole golf course and tennis courts.

The golf course is the home course for the UCLA Bruins men's and women's golf teams.

Bibliography
Joe Novak, Bel-Air Country Club: A Living Legend (Delmar Printing, 1993)

References

External links
 (archived)

Organizations based in Los Angeles
Golf clubs and courses in Los Angeles
Golf clubs and courses designed by William P. Bell
Tennis venues in Los Angeles
UCLA Bruins golf